Sergeyevka (Sergeev) is a town and the administrative center of Shal akyn District in North Kazakhstan Region of Kazakhstan. Population:

References

Populated places in North Kazakhstan Region